Meteugoa ochrivena is a moth of the family Erebidae. It was described by George Hampson in 1898. It is found in the north-eastern Himalayas, Taiwan and on Borneo and Bali. The habitat consists of lower montane forests, hill dipterocarp forests and lowland forests.

References

 

Moths described in 1898
Lithosiini